The Ecuador national football team has appeared at four FIFA World Cups, the world's premier football tournament for national football teams. Ecuador's first participation in the World Cup was in 2002. Their best performance was in 2006, where they were eliminated in the round of 16.

Qualification history
From 1930 to 1938, Ecuador refrained from FIFA World Cup qualification tournaments. Its first entry was the 1950 qualifiers tournament, but withdrew from qualification. Ecuador did not enter the 1954 and 1958 tournaments. From 1962 to 1998, Ecuador failed to qualify for the world's premier football tournament. They earned their first qualification in 2002 after finishing 2nd in South America. The qualification for the second tournament in 2006 was achieved after finishing 3rd in South America. Ecuador finished 6th in South America but did not qualify for a third consecutive World Cup qualification tournament. Ecuador returned at the 2014 qualifier edition before they were eliminated from 2018 edition.

World Cup record
Although Ecuador has advanced past the group stage only once, nonetheless they have managed to win at least one match in each tournament they participated in. In three of the four World Cups Ecuador has played, they were coached by Colombian managers.

2002 FIFA World Cup

Ecuador qualified for their first FIFA World Cup by finishing second in the CONMEBOL qualification tournament, finishing ahead of Brazil. Ecuador were drawn into Group G, alongside Mexico, Italy, and Croatia.

Ecuador made a losing World Cup debut against worldpowers Italy, falling 2–0 by courtesy of a Christian Vieri double. Their next match against Mexico went better, but ended in their 2–1 defeat. Agustín Delgado scored for Ecuador's first ever World Cup goal and put them ahead, but goals from Jared Borgetti and Gerardo Torrado canceled the early strike and effectively eliminated them from the tournament. A second-half goal from Édison Méndez did seal a 1–0 consolation win in the final match against Croatia. Although they finished the tournament last in their group, they managed to eliminate Croatia, previous third-place in 1998 World Cup, from the competition.

2006 FIFA World Cup

Ecuador qualified for their second FIFA World Cup by finishing third in the CONMEBOL qualification tournament. They were drawn into Group A, alongside hosts Germany, Poland, and Costa Rica.

Ecuador campaign got off with a shock 2–0 win against Poland in their first game in Gelsenkirchen, with goals from Carlos Tenorio and Agustín Delgado. They then beat Costa Rica 3–0 in Hamburg with goals coming from Carlos Tenorio, Agustín Delgado, and Iván Kaviedes. The win advanced them to the next round. Their qualification complete, they rested key players against the hosts Germany and were beaten 3–0. Ecuador finished second in Group A behind Germany and faced England in the Round of 16. A second-half free-kick from David Beckham was the only goal of the game, which eliminated Ecuador from the World Cup.

2014 FIFA World Cup

Ecuador qualified for their third FIFA World Cup by finishing fourth in the CONMEBOL qualification tournament. Ecuador was drawn into Group E, alongside France, Honduras and Switzerland.

Ecuador played its first match in Brasília, capital of Brazil. Enner Valencia scored the first goal of the match for Ecuador against Switzerland, but the squad happened to allow the European team to win 2–1. In the second match, played in the city of Curitiba, Honduras scored the first goal, but Enner Valencia scored twice, giving Ecuador its first victory at the 2014 World Cup. The last match of the group was played in Rio de Janeiro against France, but nobody scored any goal. These results were not enough to make the country qualify to the next phase of the tournament.

2022 FIFA World Cup

Group stage

Player records

Most matches

Most goals

References

External links
Official website of the Ecuadorian Football Federation 
Ecuador at FIFA.com

 
World Cup
Countries at the FIFA World Cup